Guitier (Ithier) of Rethel (died 1171), son of Odo of Vitry and Matilda, Countess of Rethel, nephew of Baldwin II of Jerusalem, was Count of Rethel, succeeding his mother.  (His father is named as count, but it is not clear that he ever served.)  Châtelain de Vitry.  In March 1129, Guitier travelled to the Holy Land, although it is not clear if he participated in the Damascus Crusade that year.

Guitier married Beatrix of Namur, daughter of Godfrey I, Count of Namur, and Erminside.  Guitier and Beatrix had eleven children:
 Beatrix de Rethel (1130 – 30 March 1185), married Roger II, King of Sicily
 Jean de Rethel (died after 1144)
 Manasses de Rethel (died after 1144)
 Hugues de Rethel (died after 1166), monk at Reims
 Manasses IV (died 1199)
 Henri de Rethel (died 1191), Châtelain de Vitry
 Baudouin de Rethel (died 1198 or after), Seigneur de Chemery
 Albert de Rethel (died 1195 or after), Archdeacon at Liège
 Simon de Rethel
 Clemence de Rethel (died after 1190), married Hugh of Pierrepont, Bishop of Liège
 Unnamed daughter, married Geoffroy, Vidame de Châlons.

Upon his death, he was succeeded as Count of Rethel by his son Manasses IV.

References

Sources 

Christians of the First Crusade
1171 deaths